Sumner School was a school for Aftican Americans in Parkersburg, West Virginia. It was established in 1862 during the American Civil War. J. Rupert Jefferson led it for more than 40 years. It closed in 1955 after desegregation. The school's 1926 gymnasium is now the Sumnerite African-American History Museum and Multipurpose Center.

It was originally known as Parkersburg Colored School. The school was renamed for abolitionist U.S. senator Charles Sumner.

Michael J. Rice wrote The Sumner 7: A History of Sumner High School.

References

Buildings and structures in Parkersburg, West Virginia
Historically segregated African-American schools in West Virginia
1862 establishments in the United States
Educational institutions established in 1862
1955 disestablishments in West Virginia
Educational institutions disestablished in 1955